Marko Perinović (born 29 October 1970) is a Croatian rower. He competed in the men's coxless pair event at the 1992 Summer Olympics.

References

1970 births
Living people
Croatian male rowers
Olympic rowers of Croatia
Rowers at the 1992 Summer Olympics
Sportspeople from Zadar